Commodore Charles W. Morgan (1790 – January 5, 1853) was an officer in the United States Navy during the War of 1812.

Biography

He was promoted to captain in 1831 and commanded 74-gun ship of the line .  He also served as the commodore of the Mediterranean Squadron.

Morgan died in Washington, D.C., in 1853.  He was survived by his wife, Julia.

He should not be confused with Charles Waln Morgan (1796–1861), the original owner of the whaling ship , which is preserved by Mystic Seaport in Stonington, Connecticut.

Dates of rank
Midshipman - 1 January 1808
Lieutenant - 3 March 1813
Master Commandant - 15 April 1820
Captain - 21 February 1831

References

External links

1790 births
1853 deaths
United States Navy commodores
United States Navy personnel of the War of 1812
American people of Welsh descent